Pan Xia (born October 5, 1981 in Zigong, Sichuan) is a female Chinese softball player. She was part of the 3rd placed team at the 2005 National Games.

She will compete for Team China at the 2008 Summer Olympics in Beijing.

References
Profile

Olympic softball players of China
People from Zigong
Softball players at the 2004 Summer Olympics
Softball players at the 2008 Summer Olympics
1981 births
Living people
Softball players
Sportspeople from Sichuan